Indian actor Rajkummar Rao made his lead film debut with Dibakar Banerjee's found footage anthology film Love Sex Aur Dhokha (2010). After a few supporting roles in films like Gangs of Wasseypur – Part 2 (2012) and Talaash: The Answer Lies Within, his breakthrough came with the drama film Kai Po Che! in 2013. He rose to prominence with his portrayal of a lawyer Shahid Azmi in Hansal Mehta's critically acclaimed biographical drama Shahid (2013), for which he was awarded the National Film Award for Best Actor and the Filmfare Critics Award for Best Actor.

Rao went on to feature in the successful romantic comedy Queen (2014), Aligarh (2016) and Trapped (2016). Trapped earned him a second Filmfare Critics Award for Best Actor. Among his 2017 releases, the romantic comedy Bareilly Ki Barfi and the black comedy Newton were both commercial successes and won him several accolades; the Filmfare Award for Best Supporting Actor for the former and the Asia Pacific Screen Award for Best Actor for the latter. In 2018, he starred in the horror-comedy Stree, which is the highest-grossing film of his career to date.

Films

Web series

Music videos

References

External links 
 Rajkummar Rao filmography at IMDb

Male actor filmographies
Indian filmographies